0110111 – Quantum Physics & A Horseshoe is the second live album and first live video release by Berlin-based indie punk band Bonaparte. It was released by Staatsakt label in 2011, and contains live songs recorded while touring for their second album, My Horse Likes You. The album was released on DVD, double vinyl and digital download.

Track listing

The Movie
"Ouverture"
"Do You Want to Party"
"Tú me molas"
"Wrygdwylife?"
"Anti Anti"
"Ego"
"My Horse Likes You"
"Fly a Plane Into Me"
"Adabmal"
Intermission
"Rave Rave Rave"
"Wir sind keine Menschen"
"Computer in Love"
"My Body Is a Battlefield"
"I Can't Dance"
"Blow It Up"
"Killing Time"
"Who Took the Pill?"
"Too Much"
"Gigolo Vagabundo"
"Bienvenido"
"3 Minutes in the Brain of Bonaparte"

Extras
Behind the Scenes (Short Film)
Marching Band (Video)
Extra Songs
"L'état c'est moi"
"Boycott Everything"
"A-a-ah"
"No, I'm Against It!"
"L'état c'est moi" (16mm)

The Soundtrack
"Ouverture" / "Do You Want to Party" – 2:33
"Tú me molas" – 3:17
"Wrygdwylife?" – 3:36
"Anti Anti" – 3:18
"Ego" – 4:11
"L'état c'est moi" – 4:02
"My Horse Likes You" – 3:16
"Boycott Everything" – 3:17
"Fly a Plane Into Me" – 5:31
"Adabmal" – 6:22
"Rave Rave Rave" – 3:46
"Wir sind keine Menschen" – 4:54
"Computer in Love" – 4:15
"My Body Is a Battlefield" – 3:16
"технология" – 3:47
"I Can't Dance" – 3:18
"Blow It Up" – 4:24
"Killing Time" – 2:42
"Who Took the Pill?" – 3:14
"Too Much" – 3:44
"No, I'm Against It!" – 1:55
"Gigolo Vagabundo" – 7:10
"Bienvenido" – 3:47
"3 Minutes in the Brain of Bonaparte" – 5:13

Notes
The DVD contains the movie with extras, and a code to download the soundtrack on MP3. It also included a bag of popcorn and three postcards.
The double vinyl version contains the soundtrack and a code to download the MP3 version.
The digital download version includes the soundtrack and the movie without extra songs.

References

2011 live albums
Live video albums
Bonaparte (band) live albums
2011 video albums
Bonaparte (band) video albums